Sandhya Raagam is a 1989 Indian Tamil-language drama film produced, written and directed by Balu Mahendra. It stars Chokkalinga Bagavathar, Oviyar Veera Santhanam and Archana in prominent roles. Shot in black-and-white, the film was photographed and edited by Mahendra himself. At the 37th National Film Awards, it won the Award for Best Film on Family Welfare (1990).

Plot 
Chokkalingam, an octagenarian, leaves his village upon the death of his wife. He migrates to Madras, where his nephew Vasu, a lower-middle-class man lives along with his family. Chokkalingam becomes an additional burden for Vasu, who is not able to meet the demands of his own family.

Cast 
 Chokkalinga Bhagavathar as Chokkalingam
 Archana as Thulasi
 Oviyar Veera Santhanam as Vasu
 Baby Rajalakshmi as Valli

Themes 
The film's central theme revolves around old age.

Production 
The film was made on a shoestring budget. Like his previous films, Mahendra wrote the screenplay, edited and photographed the film apart from handling the direction. Ramasamy was hired as the art director while V. S. Murthy and A. S. Laxmi Narayanan looked after the audiography. The film did not have any songs; L. Vaidyanathan composed the background score.

Reception 
Sandhya Raagam is yet to have a theatrical release, but was regularly aired on Doordarshan. N. Krishnaswamy of The Indian Express said, "Balu Mahendra narrates the plight of his lead character with a tremendously observant eye. The celluloid breathes silence and beauty, and the humour and piquancy of the situations are striking".

The film won the National Film Award for Best Film on Family Welfare in 1990. A year later, it was screened at the International Film Festival of India along with Anjali (1990) as the only two Tamil films as part of Indian Panorama. In a 2007 interview to The Hindu, Mahendra said that Sandhya Raagam and Veedu were his two films "with the fewest compromises and mistakes."

In 2011, Mahendra said that there was no existing negative of the film.

Notes

References

External links 
 

1980s Tamil-language films
1989 drama films
1989 films
Best Film on Family Welfare National Film Award winners
Films directed by Balu Mahendra
Films scored by L. Vaidyanathan
Indian black-and-white films
Indian drama films